The rowing competitions at the 2013 Mediterranean Games in Mersin took place between 21 June and 23 June at the Çukurova University Boathouse Venues. Çukurova University is in Adana.

Athletes competed in 7 events. Women's lightweight double sculls was cancelled because too few nations applied.

Medal summary

Men's events

Women's events

References

 
Rowing at the Mediterranean Games
Mediterranean Games
Rowing competitions in Turkey
Sports at the 2013 Mediterranean Games